The ARM Cortex-A715 is the second generation ARMv9 "big" Cortex CPU. Compared to its predecessor the Cortex-A710 the Cortex-A715 CPU is noted for having a 20% increase in power efficiency, and  5% improvement in performance. The Cortex-A715 shows comparable performance to the previous generation Cortex-X1 CPU. This generation of chips starting with the A715 drops native 32-bit support which is noted as a possible problem in 32-bit workloads.

References

ARM processors